Local elections were held in Malta on 12 March 2005. The Malta Labour Party won an absolute majority.  Approximately 68% of the eligible voters turned up on election day. In Malta the vast majority of the electorate normally votes on election days, with turnout sometimes averaging above 92% for general elections.

The number of councillors for each locality is determined according to the population in the locality, where 5 is the minimum and 13 the maximum number of councillors. This decision has been strongly criticized and many Nationalists too did not agree with such 'strategic measures', as quoted by the Maltese Prime Minister, Lawrence Gonzi. The Nationalist Party has been accused of threatening democracy in Malta by reducing the number of candidates just minutes before the closing stipulated time for accepting nominations.  Two localities (Marsa and Zejtun, both famous for being Malta Labour Party strongholds) did not vote in these elections because of this reason.

Results

2005
Maltese local elections
Local council elections
March 2005 events in Europe